Pukaar (lit: Call) is a 2018 Pakistani drama serial that premiered on 8 February 2018 on ARY Digital. It is directed by Farooq Rind and written by Adeel Razzaq. It stars Zahid Ahmed and Yumna Zaidi, in lead roles in their third on-screen appearance after Jugnoo and Zara Yaad Kar. The serial is produced by Humayun Saeed and Shehzad Nasib under their production company Six Sigma Plus.

Plot 
Samra is a bubbly, innocent and cheerful girl who lives a perfect happy life with her parents. Fahad Sultan, the son of a feudal lord studies with Samra and the two fall in love. They get married and live a happy life although Samra has problems adjusting  in the feudal system while she was raised in a modern household. Fahad was going to contest elections due to the influence of his politician father, but some enemies shoot him to death. This turns Samra's life upside down. She is deeply saddened by her husband's death and in addition to that, her husband's family imposes ruthless rules on her. Samra's father dies in a car crash and Samra was not even allowed to go to her own father's funeral. Every sort of hardship is imposed on Samra, who is pregnant with Fahad's child.

Fahad's father, Sultan Asfantyar is deeply sadden by the death of his son and he believes he has lost his son because of a sin that he committed ---he had abandoned his first son. 28 years ago, Asfantyar had married Amna (Saba Faisal) but his mother Lalimaa jad refused to accept Amna because of which Asfantyar left the pregnant Amna. Now Asfantyar decides to bring Amna and her son to his house to rectify his mistakes. He meets his son Saarang. Saarang did not know that his father was alive and when he gets to know the truth, he is furious but Asfantyar manages to beg Saarang to come to his mansion. Amna and Saarang enter the mansion and face rejection from Laalimaa(Naveed Shahzad) and Aafandyar's second wife Taashfeen (Jia Ali). Taashfeen does not want to give Saarang the position of Fahad but Asfandyar gives Saarang all the authorities that Fahad had. Saarang falls in love with Samra. Samra gives birth to Fahad's son Qasim. Samra is miserable at the haveli so Saarang tries to help her by getting her a secret mobile phone which she can use to contact her mother. Samra finally runs away from the haveli with the help of Saarang. Saarang decides that the only way he can get Samra to safety is if she marries him as Saarang now has power and authority. Samra initially refuses out of loyalty to Fahad but unknowingly she starts to fall for him. Thinking of her son, she agrees to marry Saarang and they do so and face rejection from the family except Amna. Saarang decides to take his mother and Samra with them to live somewhere else but is stopped by Laali Maa who refuses to let Samra leave and taunts her for betraying Fahad. Samra retaliates by calling her out of her behaviour saying she’s the reason for everything even Fahad’s death and she continues criticising her until  Laali Maa suffers a heart attack.

Samra moves away to live with her mum and Laali Maa finally wakes up and regrets everything she has done. She finally accepts Saarang as her grandson and also Samra but the latter is still unable to forgive her. Asfantyar visits Samra and his grandson and asks forgiveness and she forgives him and finally lets him see his grandson. In her imagination, Samra sees Fahad who tells her to accept her feelings for Saarang and gives his blessings. In the end, Samra finally forgives Laali Maa and her and Saarang finally confess their love for each other.

Cast
Yumna Zaidi as Samra Sarang; Sarang’s wife, Fahad’s former wife
Zahid Ahmed as Sarang Sultan; Sultan and Amna’s son, Samra’s second husband 
Saad Qureshi as Fahad Sultan; Sultan and Taashfeen’s son, Samra’s first husband (decreased)
Naveed Shahzad as Laali Maa; Sultan Asfand’s mother 
Rehan Sheikh as Sultan Asfand; Sarang and Fahad’s father, Laali Maa’s son, Amna and Taashfeen’s husband
Jia Ali as Taashfeen; Fahad's mother, Sultan’s second wife
Laila Zuberi as Rabia; Samra's mother
Shehryar Zaidi as Najaf; Samra's father
Saba Faisal as Amna; Sarang's mother, Sultan’s first wife
Kausar Siddiqui as Zamani; Laali Maa’s maid

Awards and nominations

References

External links 
 

Pakistani drama television series
Urdu-language television shows
ARY Digital original programming
2018 Pakistani television series debuts